Kapyl District is a second-level administrative subdivision (raion) of Minsk Region, Belarus. The capital of the town is Kapyl.

Notable events in history 
 The district was the main theatre of military operations during the Slutsk uprising, a pro-independence anti-Soviet uprising in 1920.

Notable residents 

 Ales Adamovich (1927, Kanuchi village – 1994), Belarusian writer and critic, author of the screenplay for film “Come and See” 
 Paval Zhauryd (1889, Cieciarouka village – 1939), Belarusian military figure, one of the commanders of the Slutsk defence action and a victim of Stalin's purges

References

 
Districts of Minsk Region